The 1988 Oklahoma State Cowboys football team represented the Oklahoma State University in the 1988 NCAA Division I-A college football season. Future OSU head coach Mike Gundy was the starting QB for the Cowboys, while senior WR Hart Lee Dykes and junior RB Barry Sanders were both named first team All-American. Sanders won the Heisman Trophy as the nation's most outstanding player for the season. Sanders was also the Offensive MVP of the 1988 Holiday Bowl, and Junior LB Sim Drain III was the Defensive MVP.

Schedule
The Cowboys finished the regular season with a 9–2 record. In 1988, in what has been called the greatest season in college football history, running back Barry Sanders led the nation by averaging 7.6 yards per carry and over 200 yards per game, including rushing for over 300 yards in four games. He set college football season records with 2,628 yards rushing, 3,249 total yards, 234 points, 39 touchdowns, of which 37 were rushing (also a record), five consecutive 200 yard games, scored at least two touchdowns in 11 consecutive games, and nine times he scored at least three touchdowns. Sanders also ran for 222 yards and scored five touchdowns in his three quarters of action in the Holiday Bowl, a game that was not included with his season statistics.

Personnel

Rankings

Game summaries

Miami (OH)

Texas A&M

Tulsa

at Colorado

at Nebraska

Missouri

at Kansas State

Oklahoma

Oklahoma State's Brent Parker dropped a potential game-winning touchdown pass in the end zone with 43 seconds left.

Kansas

at Iowa State

vs. Texas Tech

vs. Wyoming

1989 NFL Draft
The following players were drafted into professional football following the season.

Awards and honors
Barry Sanders, Heisman Trophy, Maxwell Award, Walter Camp Award, Sporting News College Football Player of the Year, Big 8 Offensive Player of the Year, Unanimous First-team All-American
Hart Lee Dykes, Consensus First-team All-American

References

Oklahoma State
Oklahoma State Cowboys football seasons
Holiday Bowl champion seasons
Oklahoma State Cowboys football